Carl Friedrich Warnstorf (2 December 1837 in Sommerfeld – 28 February 1921 in Berlin-Friedenau) was a German educator and bryologist specializing in sphagnum studies.

He received his education at the teaching seminar in Neuzelle (1855-1858), afterwards worked as a school teacher in Arnswalde (1859 to 1867) and Neuruppin (1867 to 1899). Following retirement from teaching he settled in Berlin. In 1917 he was awarded with the title of professor. During World War II his herbarium of 30,000 items was destroyed in the midst of the bombing of Berlin (1943).

The genus Warnstorfia was named in his honor by bryologist Leopold Loeske (1865-1935).

Published works 
He was editor of the section on Sphagnales-Sphagnaceae in Adolf Engler's Das Pflanzenreich. The following are some of Warnstorf's main works:
 Die Europäischen Torfmoose, Berlin. 152 S. (1881) - European sphagnum.
 Zur Bryo-Geographie des Russischen Reiches (1913-14) - Bryo-geography of the Russian Reich.
 Bryophyta (Sphagnales-Bryales-Hepaticae) — In: Adolf Pascher's "Die Süsswasser-Flora Deutschlands, Österreichs und der Schweiz". 14: 222 S. (with Wilhelm Mönkemeyer and Victor Félix Schiffner), 1914 - Bryophyta (Sphagnales-Bryales-Hepaticae).
 Pottia-Studien als Vorarbeiten zu einer Monographie des Genus "Pottia Ehrh." sens. str. — Hedwigia 58: 35–152. (1916) - Studies of the genus Pottia.

References 

1837 births
1921 deaths
20th-century German botanists
Bryologists
People from Lubsko
People from the Province of Brandenburg
19th-century German botanists